The history of Reading Football Club covers almost 150 years of both success and failure of the football club from Reading, England. The club was established in 1871, making it one of the oldest professional teams in England. Reading joined the Football League in 1920. The Royals competed at the top flight of English football for the first time in the 2006–07 season.

Early years (1871–1941)
Reading Football Club was formed on 25 December 1871 by founder Joseph Edward Sydenham. They were originally nicknamed The Biscuitmen after one of the main trades in the town, Huntley & Palmers biscuits, but changed to the Royals in the 1970s, when the company closed their factory. This history is reflected in the name of the club's unofficial fanzine, Hob Nob Anyone?, named after a popular British biscuit.

The switch to professionalism in 1895 resulted in the need for a bigger ground and, to this end, the club moved again, to the purpose-built Elm Park on 5 September 1896.

In 1913, Reading toured Italy and beat Genoa 4–2 and A.C. Milan 5–0, narrowly lost 2–1 to Casale, before beating Italian champions Pro Vercelli 6–0 and the full Italian national team 2–0, prompting the leading sports newspaper Corriere della Sera to write "without doubt, Reading FC are the finest foreign team seen in Italy."  Reading were invited back for another tour the following year, but there is no evidence it took place. It is possible it was cancelled due to the imminence of World War I, which claimed the lives of many Reading F.C. players, including Alan Foster, who put a hat-trick past Milan. Other players lost included amateurs Charles West and Heber Slatter. Attilio Fresia moved to Reading as a result of the tour, becoming the first Italian to play in English football.

Reading were elected to the Third Division of the Football League in 1920, as the league absorbed the first division club of the Southern Football League. The club have spent the majority of the time since then in the third and fourth tiers of the league, with occasional flirtations with the second tier.

Reading's best performance in the FA Cup came in 1926–27 when they lost to eventual winners Cardiff City at Molineux in Wolverhampton in the semi-final. The attendance at the 1–0 victory over Brentford in the fifth round set a new attendance record for Elm Park, at 33,042 people. This remains the highest attendance at a Reading home match.

Reading were promoted to the Second Division, following a Third Division South title win in 1926; the Royals were relegated back to the third tier in May 1931. The club defeated Bristol City to win the Southern Section Cup in 1938, and won the London War Cup in 1941 by defeating Brentford 3–2 in the final at Stamford Bridge.

Post-war years (1945–1990)

The club remained in Division Three after the war, but finished in second place in their division in 1948–49 and 1951–52. Their 10–2 win over Crystal Palace in September 1946 remains the club's scoring record.

Reading were relegated to the fourth tier of English football for the first time in the 1971–72 season. A return to the Third Division was achieved, following a third-placed finish in 1975–76, but the club suffered immediate relegation. The 1978–79 season saw Reading win the Fourth Division to win promotion back to the Third Division.

Relegation was suffered in 1982–83. Towards the end of that season, Oxford United chairman Robert Maxwell announced that he had completed a deal to merge Oxford and Reading into a single club – Thames Valley Royals. Maxwell claimed that both clubs were on the verge of bankruptcy and having a united team was required for the Thames Valley region to retain a Football League club. The proposed amalgamation was prevented by the actions of Roy Tranter, a Reading director, and Roger Smee, a former Reading player. Smee disputed the legitimacy of the controlling interest in Reading held by the three board members that supported the merger plan. Tranter launched a legal challenge to the sale of certain shares on 22 April 1983. The supporters of the plan allies resigned under pressure from the rest of the Reading board in May 1983. At an extraordinary shareholders' meeting in July, Smee took over the club to end the amalgamation plans.

Following the collapse of the merger plan, Reading were promoted back to the Third Division at the end of the 1983–84 season. This remains the last time the football club has competed at this level of English football. Reading won the league in the 1985–86 season under the management of Ian Branfoot, following a run of thirteen successive wins at the start of the season, earning promotion to the Second Division. This was the first time in fifty-five years that the club had played at this level.

The club reached their first major cup final in the 1987–88 season, when they won the Simod Cup. They beat four top flight sides en route to the final. The club's first Wembley appearance saw the club victorious over First Division Luton Town, with a 4–1 victory. Later in the season, the club were relegated back to the third tier. Branfoot left his job as manager in October 1989, having failed to get the Royals back into the Second Division. His successor, Ian Porterfield, lasted just 18 months before further failures cost him his job.

New era (1990–1998)
The appointment of Mark McGhee as player-manager, shortly after the takeover by John Madejski, in June 1991 saw Reading move forward.

They were crowned champions of the new Division Two in 1994, seeing the club promoted to the second tier. When McGhee moved to Leicester City halfway through the following season, Reading were in contention for a second successive promotion. 35-year-old striker Jimmy Quinn was put in charge of the first team alongside midfielder Mick Gooding and guided Reading to runners-up in the final Division One table – only to be denied automatic promotion because of the streamlining of the Premier League, from twenty-two teams to twenty. Reading had eased past Tranmere Rovers in the play-off semi-finals and looked to have booked their place in the Premier League after building up a 2–0 lead over Bolton Wanderers by half time in the play-off final. Two late goals from Bolton forced extra time and the match ended 4–3 to Bolton. Quinn and Gooding's contracts were not renewed two years later after Reading had slid into the bottom half of Division One.

Their successor, Terry Bullivant, lasted less than one season before being sacked in March 1998. The Royals finished that season bottom of Division One, slipping back into Division Two in their final season at Elm Park.

Onwards and upwards (1998–2008)
Reading moved into the new 24,200 all-seater Madejski Stadium, named after chairman John Madejski, in August 1998. The club won their first match at the ground, beating Luton Town 3–0.

Tommy Burns had taken over from Terry Bullivant but lasted just 18 months before being sacked in September 1999, after a poor start to the season after the club's failure to win promotion the previous season. He was replaced by former reserve team manager Alan Pardew.

Pardew guided Reading to a third-place finish in the 2000–01 season, where the club were beaten in the play-off final by Walsall 3–2 after extra time. Later on in 2001, Reading became the first football club to register their fans as an official member of their squad, giving the "player" registered with squad number 13 as 'Reading Fans'.

Reading returned to Division One for the 2002–03 season after finishing runners-up in Division Two. A final day draw away at promotion rivals Brentford saw the club promoted. The following season they finished fourth in Division One and qualified for the play-offs, where they lost in the semi-final to eventual winners Wolverhampton Wanderers. Pardew acrimoniously moved to West Ham United the following October and being replaced by Brighton & Hove Albion manager Steve Coppell. Coppell took the Royals to seventh in his first full season with the club, missing out on a place in the play-offs by three points.

Reading won the 2005–06 Championship with a league record 106 points, scoring 99 goals and losing only twice in league. Promotion to the Premiership was assured on 25 March 2006, with a 1–1 draw away at Leicester City. The following Saturday, the club secured the title with a 5–0 thumping of Derby County.

The 2006–07 season saw Reading make their first appearance in the top flight of English football. Striker Dave Kitson became the first player to score for Reading in the top flight, as the Royals came from 2–0 to beat Middlesbrough 3–2 in their first game in the Premiership. The Royals defied pre-season predictions of relegation to finish the season in eighth place with 55 points, missing out on UEFA Cup football by a single point; Reading turned down the chance to play in the UEFA Intertoto Cup.

In the run up to their second season in the Premier League, Reading were invited to take part in the 2007 Peace Cup in South Korea, playing Argentine giants River Plate, French champions Lyon and Japanese side Shimizu S-Pulse. The Royals failed to qualify for the final on goal difference. This second season was less successful and Reading were relegated back to the Championship following a loss of form in the second half of the season. Despite winning 4–0 away at fellow strugglers Derby County on the last day of the season, Fulham's 1–0 at Portsmouth was enough to see the club fall out of the top flight.

Recent seasons (2008–present)
Reading started the 2008–09 season with a 15 match unbeaten home run until losing to Southampton. In the second half of the season, they struggled to regain the form and slipped down the table before recovering to finish fourth and qualify for the play-offs, where they lost to Burnley in the semi-final. Manager Steve Coppell resigned just hours after the game, being replaced by former academy manager Brendan Rodgers. Rodgers left the club by mutual consent on 16 December 2009, following a poor start to the season which saw the Royals in a relegation battle.

Brian McDermott was made caretaker manager the same day. He was given the job on a full-time basis, following a surprise 2–1 extra time win over Liverpool at Anfield in the FA Cup. Reading reached the quarter-finals of the competition for the first time since the 1927 cup-run, losing 4–2 to Aston Villa at the Madejski Stadium. In the following season, Reading beat West Bromwich Albion, Stevenage and Everton to reach the quarter-final of the competition for the second successive season, where they lost 1–0 to Manchester City at the City of Manchester Stadium. In the league, Reading finished fifth in the Championship to qualify for the division's play-offs. After beating Cardiff City in the semi-finals they lost 4–2 to Swansea City in the final at Wembley Stadium.

Reading started the 2011–12 season by selling captain Matt Mills and player of the season Shane Long. Early results were not favourable and the club sat second-bottom of the table after six games. However, a streak of good form in the second half of the season, combined with the signings of Adam Le Fondre, Kaspars Gorkšs and Jason Roberts, ensured promotion to the Premier League on 17 April 2012 with 1–0 home win against Nottingham Forest. In their next match on 21 April 2012, Reading secured the Championship title with a game to spare after 2–2 draw with Crystal Palace when second-placed Southampton failed to beat Middlesbrough, losing 2–1.

On 21 January 2012, it was announced that John Madejski planned to sell 51% of the club to Thames Sport Investments led by Russian-born Anton Zingarevich which was eventually completed on 29 May 2012.

On 30 October 2012, Reading created an unwanted record in the last 16 of the League Cup. At home to Arsenal, they took a 4–0 lead after 37 minutes, but Arsenal drew level at 4–4 in stoppage time to take the match into extra time, where Reading lost 7–5. Reading became the first club in the League or FA Cup to have scored five goals in a match and to have still lost. At the end of the 2012–13 season, Reading were relegated back to the Championship following a 0–0 draw with relegation rivals Queens Park Rangers.

On 17 March 2015, Reading beat Bradford City 3–0 at the Madjeski Stadium in an FA Cup quarter-final replay to advance to the semi-finals of the FA Cup for the first time since 1927. The Royals were defeated by Premier League Arsenal 2–1, after extra time, to end the club's run in the competition. The club reached the quarter-finals in the next season, losing to Crystal Palace after two late goals by the Premier League outfit.

In the 2016–17, Reading reached the play-offs, following a third place league finish, under new manager Jaap Stam. The Royals narrowly beat Fulham 2-1 on aggregate in the semi-finals to advance to the final. Following a 0–0 draw at Wembley on 29 May 2017, Huddersfield Town defeated Reading 4–3 on penalties to deny the club a return to the Premier League.

References

History
History of Reading, Berkshire
History of association football clubs in England